Eupithecia repentina is a moth in the family Geometridae. It is endemic to eastern Russia, Korea, China and Japan.

The species was introduced with its foodplant (Mosla dianthera) to a small park in Novomoskovsk (Tula Province, Russia) between 1950 and 1990. This small area now supports a small population of the species.

The wingspan is about 19–21 mm. The ground colour of the forewings is mostly dark brown, but partly greyish. The hindwings are brownish yellow.

References

Moths described in 1978
repentina
Moths of Asia